Hesnes Air AS was a Norwegian private airline and helicopter company with registered office at Nøtterøy and office and hangar at Sandefjord Airport, Torp in  Norway. The company was founded in 1992 and operates charter, cargo and ambulance flights, as well as helicopter operations throughout Europe. Hesnes Air specializes in complex and sophisticated aircraft- and helicopter services for both companies and private persons. The company is owned by Hesnes Holding AS, which operates within shipping and ship brokerage.



History
Hesnes Air was established in 1992 and was granted operating permission from the CAA the same year. As a helicopter company with an Airbus Helicopter H125 (formerly Eurocopter AS 350 B3) Hesnes Air took on missions including long-line of flight, photo flights, cargo flights, predator monitoring, line monitoring, air taxi and passenger transport for private and business purposes across the country.

The company expanded its operations in 2006 acquiring its first aircraft, a Beechcraft B200C King Air. This aircraft was used for freight charters and ambulance missions, including donor flights all over Europe. The company expanded its operations again in 2007 with their second plane, a Cessna Citation Encore. In 2012 the company acquired an additional Cessna Citation Encore, and again in 2015 the fleet was expanded with a Cessna Citation Bravo and a second Airbus Helicopter H125 (formerly Eurocopter AS 350).

In April 2018 Pegasus Helicopter has signed an agreement with its Hesnes Air to take over Hesnes' helicopter operations.

In May 2018, the Swedish company Hummingbird Aviation acquired Hesnes Air. The company established a new base for the new Norwegian part of H-bird at Oslo Airport.

Fleet
Hesnes Air operated the following:

References

External links

 

Defunct airlines of Norway
Airlines established in 1992
Transport companies of Vestfold og Telemark
Companies based in Sandefjord
Norwegian companies established in 1992
2018 disestablishments in Norway